The 17th Central Auditing Commission of the All-Union Communist Party (Bolsheviks) was elected by the 17th Congress, and was in session from 1934 until 1939.

Membership
 Yakov Agranov (1893–1938)
 Vladimir Adoratsky (1878–1945)
 Ivan Alekseyev (1895–1937)
 Lazar Aronshtam (1896–1938)
 Mikhail Vladimirsky (1874–1951) — CAC Chairman.
 Mikhey Yerbanov (1889–1938)
 Aleksei Kiselyov (1879–1937)
 Yevgeniya Kogan (1886–1938)
 Grigory Krutov (1894–1939)
 Mamia Orakhelashvili (1881–1937)
 Pavel Pevznyak (1892–1942)
 Yakov Popok (1894–1938)
 Stanislav Redens (1892–1940)
 Yevgeny Ryabinin (1892–1938)
 Yakov Soyfer (1885–1938)
 Kirill Sukhomlin (1886–1938)
 Vasily Fomin (1896–1938)
 Aghasi Khanjian (1901–1936)
 Mikhail Khloplyankin (1892–1938)
 Sergei Chutskayev (1876–1944)
 Ilya Shelekhes (1891–1938)
 Nikolai Janson (1882–1938)

References

Central Auditing Commission of the Communist Party of the Soviet Union
1934 establishments in the Soviet Union
1939 disestablishments in the Soviet Union